Böddiger Berg is a small vineyard next to village Böddiger, which is part of township Felsberg in the county of Schwalm-Eder-Kreis, Hesse, Germany. It is the northernmost vineyard in Hesse and was one of the first organic vineyards in Germany.

Vine was already grown in this region during medieval times, however at some point in the early modern era the production ceased. In the 1950s the entrepreneur Georg Angersbach revived the wine production and laid the base for the current vineyard. Financial difficulties and harvest loss due to harsh weather conditions led to an interruption of the production after Angersbach's death in 1979. The property was taken over by the state of Hesse, which used it as a therapy center for drug addiction. In 1992 a local society formed to continue the vine growing tradition. It rented parts of the original vineyard from the state and started to produce organic wine.

In the 1970s the vineyard also became the subject of a legal battle, when state authorities tried to shut down the wine production in this region in favour of the better known wine regions Southern Hesse. The authorities however lost in court and the wine production continued.

External links 
 Förderverein Böddiger Berg (German)
 Vineyard Böddiger Berg at the website of the town of Felsberg (German)

References 

Hills of Hesse